The 2021–22 season was the 57th season in the existence of SC Cambuur and the club's first season back in the top flight of Dutch football. In addition to the domestic league, SC Cambuur participated in this season's editions of the KNVB Cup.

Players

First-team squad

Out on loan

Transfers

In
Tom Boere

Sam Hendriks

Marco Tol

Out

Pre-season and friendlies

Competitions

Overall record

Eredivisie

League table

Results summary

Results by round

Matches
The league fixtures were announced on 11 June 2021.

KNVB Cup

References

SC Cambuur seasons
SC Cambuur